Honer or Höner is the surname of:

 Daniel Höner (born 1953), Swiss former figure skater, national champion from 1967 to 1973
 Dean Honer, half of the English electronic music duo I Monster
 Manfred Höner, German former football coach
 Marvin Höner (born 1994), German footballer
 Oliver Höner (born 1966), Swiss figure skating coach and former skater
 Honer (Godalming cricketer), English cricketer (first name unknown)

See also
 Honer Plaza, one of the first shopping centers in Orange County, California, United States
 Hœnir, a god in Norse mythology
 Honour